Obdulio Trasante  (born 20 April 1960 in Juan Lacaze) is a former Uruguayan footballer.

Career
Trasante played for Grêmio in the 1988 and 1989 Campeonato Brasileiro Série A. Trasante made five appearances for the senior Uruguay national football team from 1987 to 1988. He also played in the 1987 Copa América.

References

External links
 

1960 births
Living people
People from Juan Lacaze
Uruguayan footballers
Uruguay international footballers
1987 Copa América players
Central Español players
Peñarol players
Grêmio Foot-Ball Porto Alegrense players
Deportivo Cali footballers
Uruguayan expatriate footballers
Expatriate footballers in Brazil
Expatriate footballers in Colombia
Uruguayan Primera División players
Campeonato Brasileiro Série A players
Categoría Primera A players
Copa América-winning players
Association football defenders